Miss Universe Croatia 2019 the 20th edition of Miss Universe Croatia pageant held on April 27, 2019, in Zagreb. 18 contestants around Croatia competed for the prestigious crown. Mia Pojatina of Nova Gradiška crowned Mia Rkman of Korčula at the end of the event. She represented Croatia at Miss Universe 2019 pageant and placed in the Top 20.

Delegates 
18 contestants competed for the title.

External links 
Miss Universe Croatia Website

References 

2019 beauty pageants
Miss Universe